Gonzales is a city in Monterey County, California, United States. The population was 8,647 at the 2020 census, up from 8,187 at the 2010 census. Gonzales is a member of the Association of Monterey Bay Area Governments. Gonzales won the Culture of Health Prize from the Robert Wood Johnson Foundation in 2019.

History 
Gonzales was founded by Dr. Mariano Gonzalez and his brother Alfredo Gonzales on land that was originally Rancho Rincon de la Puente del Monte. The rancho was given to their father, Teodoro Gonzalez, in 1836 while he was serving as alcalde of Monterey.

In 1872, they granted a  right-of-way through town to Southern Pacific Railroad, which subsequently built a depot for freight and passengers. The dominant commerce at the time was grain raising and cattle ranching. The Gonzalez brothers are also credited with constructing one of the first irrigation systems in the Salinas Valley. They built a dam and head gate on the nearby Salinas River and miles of canals throughout the area.

In the early 1900s, Gonzales became a predominantly Swiss dairy community when John B. Meyenberg brought his original milk processing procedures to the region. His Alpine Milk Company, later known as the Meyenberg Milk Products Company, opened its first plant in Gonzales in 1906. At one time, there were 7,000 cows within five miles of town being milked.

Prior to being nicknamed the "Wine Capital of Monterey County", Gonzales was known as "The Heart of the Salad Bowl" (due to its central location in the agricultural valley). Before that it was nicknamed "Little Switzerland" (due to the similarities of the valley landscape to Switzerland as well as the predominantly Swiss community at the time).

Dairy farming gave way to orchards and row crops in the 1920s and prospered due to the rich soil and advancements in irrigation, machinery and transportation facilities. These improvements to agriculture technology turned the Salinas Valley into the nation's premier agricultural center. Today, there is only one dairy farm left near town.

The first school house was built in 1874. The first church, the Gonzales Baptist Church, was built in 1884 and still holds weekly worship services today.

St. Theodore Catholic Church, named for Teodoro Gonzales, was built in 1883.

The town was officially incorporated January 10, 1947.

Geography
U.S. Route 101 passes through the northeast side of the city, with access from three exits. US 101 leads northwest  to Salinas, the county seat, and southeast  to Soledad.

Demographics

2010
At the 2010 census Gonzales had a population of 8,187. The racial makeup of Gonzales was 3,464 (42.3%) White, 81 (1.0%) African American, 124 (1.5%) Native American, 190 (2.3%) Asian, 14 (0.2%) Pacific Islander, 3,958 (48.3%) from other races, 356 (4.3%) from two or more races and 7,276 (88.9%) Hispanic or Latino of any race.

The census reported that 8,181 people (99.9% of the population) lived in households, 6 (0.1%) lived in non-institutionalized group quarters, and no one was institutionalized.

There were 1,906 households, 1,252 (65.7%) had children under the age of 18 living in them, 1,256 (65.9%) were opposite-sex married couples living together, 309 (16.2%) had a female householder with no husband present, 139 (7.3%) had a male householder with no wife present.  There were 120 (6.3%) unmarried opposite-sex partnerships, and 11 (0.6%) same-sex married couples or partnerships. 155 households (8.1%) were one person and 66 (3.5%) had someone living alone who was 65 or older. The average household size was 4.29.  There were 1,704 families (89.4% of households); the average family size was 4.45.

The age distribution was 2,856 people (34.9%) under the age of 18, 957 people (11.7%) aged 18 to 24, 2,355 people (28.8%) aged 25 to 44, 1,529 people (18.7%) aged 45 to 64, and 490 people (6.0%) who were 65 or older.  The median age was 27.0 years. For every 100 females, there were 104.7 males.  For every 100 females age 18 and over, there were 104.4 males.

There were 1,989 housing units at an average density of 1,015.2 per square mile, of the occupied units 1,019 (53.5%) were owner-occupied and 887 (46.5%) were rented. The homeowner vacancy rate was 2.7%; the rental vacancy rate was 2.1%.  4,186 people (51.1% of the population) lived in owner-occupied housing units and 3,995 people (48.8%) lived in rental housing units.

2000
At the 2000 census there were 7,525 people in 1,695 households, including 1,501 families, in the city. The racial makeup of the city was 34.78% White, 0.80% Black or African American, 1.41% Native American, 2.05% Asian, 0.17% Pacific Islander, 55.99% from other races, and 4.81% from two or more races.  86.03% of the population were Hispanic or Latino of any race.
Of the 1,695 households 61.1% had children under the age of 18 living with them, 68.0% were married couples living together, 14.2% had a female householder with no husband present, and 11.4% were non-families. 9.3% of households were one person and 4.0% were one person aged 65 or older.  The average household size was 4.42 and the average family size was 4.61.

The age distribution was 37.8% under the age of 18, 13.1% from 18 to 24, 30.7% from 25 to 44, 12.7% from 45 to 64, and 5.7% 65 or older.  The median age was 24 years. For every 100 females, there were 108.3 males.  For every 100 females age 18 and over, there were 109.3 males.

The median household income was $41,582 and the median family income  was $41,773. Males had a median income of $31,743 versus $27,115 for females. The per capita income for the city was $12,438.  About 15.0% of families and 20.2% of the population were below the poverty line, including 26.6% of those under age 18 and 11.5% of those age 65 or over.

Media

Local radio stations include KHIP-FM - 104.3 and KKMC-AM - 880. Television service for the community comes from the Monterey-Salinas-Santa Cruz designated market area (DMA). Local newspapers include the Salinas Californian, the Monterey County Herald and the Gonzales Tribune, first published in 1890, and at one time the paper with the largest circulation in Monterey County.

Wine-growing area
Gonzales is an important wine cultivation area. Wineries located in Gonzales include Constellation Brands, Robert Talbott, Pisoni Vineyards, Boekenoogen Winery McIntyre Vineyards, Mer Soleil and Salinas Valley Vineyards.

Academics, courses, graduation requirements 
Gonzales High School offers a variety of courses, including several ROP/CTE fine arts, agriculture, and tech classes. GHS also has several dual-enrollment and honors programs for language arts, mathematics, social sciences, and laboratory sciences. All courses offered to students are CSU/UC approved.

Water tower 

Climate
This region experiences dry summers with very hot days and cool nights, and moderately humid winter with mild to cool days and freezing nights. There is no average monthly temperatures above 71.6 °F.  According to the Köppen Climate Classification system, Gonzales has a hot-summer mediterranean climate, abbreviated "Csa" on climate maps.

Economy

Largest employers
According to the City of Gonzales, the largest employers in the city are:

Notable people
 John Blume, the "Father of Earthquake Engineering"; born in Gonzales
 Honoré Escolle, French businessman; purchased a  ranch two miles southwest of Gonzales

Schools
Gonzales Unified School District:
 La Gloria Elementary (K-5)
 Fairview Middle School (6-8)
 Gonzales High School (9-12)
 Somavia Continuation School

See also

Coastal California
List of school districts in Monterey County, California

References

External links
 

Cities in Monterey County, California
Incorporated cities and towns in California
Salinas Valley